Willey Station (also known as Willeys) is an unincorporated community in Christian County, Illinois, United States.

History
Israel Willey laid out the land and the community was named after him.

Notable person
Jon Corzine, financier and politician, New Jersey Governor, grew up on a farm near Willey Station.

References

Unincorporated communities in Christian County, Illinois
Unincorporated communities in Illinois